El Collao Stadium is located on Calle Oliver in the city of Alcoy (Alicante), Spain. It is the ground of CD Alcoyano with a capacity of 4,850 spectators. The stadium was inaugurated on August 28, 1921.

This stadium has hosted matches of the 1st division, 2nd division, 2nd division B, 3rd division, and regional levels.  The pitch has a dimensions of 102 x 63 meters.

References

External links

Estadios de Espana 

Sports venues completed in 1921
Football venues in the Valencian Community
Estadio El Collao
Buildings and structures in Alcoy